Mantispoidea is a superfamily of euneuropteran insects in the order Neuroptera. The group was formerly placed in the paraphyletic suborder Hemerobiiformia, but is now considered sister to the superfamilies Dilaroidea and Osmyloidea. Mantispoidea contains three living families and one extinct family described from the fossil record.

Taxonomy
Berothidae (Late Jurassic-Present)
Mantispidae (including †Dipteromantispidae) (Jurassic-Present)
†Mesoberothidae (including †Mesithonidae) (Triassic)
Rhachiberothidae (Early Cretaceous-Recent)

References

External links 

 
Insect superfamilies